Amantekha was a little known king of Nubia. He most likely ruled in the Third Century BCE. Amantekha is so far only known from his pyramid in Meroe (Beg. N.4) and was the first king buried at the North Cemetery at Meroe. The tomb and the decoration of its chapel are not well preserved. The king's name appears on blocks from the south wall of the pyramid chapel. The throne name Menibre is only partly preserved, so that other readings are possible too.

References 

3rd-century BC monarchs of Kush